Erik Barnes (born November 22, 1987) is an American professional golfer.

Early life, education, and college career
Barnes was born in Kalamazoo, Michigan, and raised in Marion, Indiana, where he attended Marion High School. He played college golf at Austin Peay State University, located in Clarksville, Tennessee, at which he was named Ohio Valley Athletic Conference freshmen of the year in 2007 and player of the year in 2009.

Professional career
After graduating in 2011, he turned professional. Barnes played on the mini-tours (NGA Hooters Tour, PGA Tour Canada, and PGA Tour Latinoamérica) from 2011 to 2014, with results including a win at the Avoca Classic at Scotch Hall Preserve as well five other top-ten finishes.

Amateur wins
 2007 ASU Indian Classic
 2008 F&M Bank APSU Intercollegiate
 2009 UK Bluegrass Invitational, Indiana Amateur, Belmont vs Austin Peay Shootout

Source:

Professional wins (2)

NGA Hooters Tour wins (1)
2011 Avoca Classic

Other wins (1)
2020 Jamaica Open

Results in major championships

CUT = missed the half-way cut

Results in The Players Championship

CUT = missed the halfway cut

See also
2022 Korn Ferry Tour Finals graduates

References

External links
 
 

American male golfers
PGA Tour golfers
PGA Tour Latinoamérica golfers
Korn Ferry Tour graduates
Golfers from Florida
Golfers from Michigan
Austin Peay State University alumni
Sportspeople from Kalamazoo, Michigan
People from Cape Coral, Florida
1987 births
Living people